Texas Tech University, often referred to as Texas Tech or TTU, is a public, coeducational, research university located in Lubbock, Texas. Established on February 10, 1923, and originally known as Texas Technological College, the university is the leading institution of the Texas Tech University System and has the seventh largest student body in the state of Texas. It is the only school in Texas to house an undergraduate institution, law school, and medical school at the same location. Initial enrollment in 1925 was 910 students; as of fall 2010, the university has 31,637 students from more than 110 countries, all 50 U.S. states and the District of Columbia. Since the university's first graduating class in 1927 of 26 students, Texas Tech has awarded more than 220,000 degrees, including 47,000 graduate and professional degrees to its alumni. The Texas Tech Alumni Association, with over 27,000 members, operates more than 120 chapters in cities throughout the United States and the world.

Since 1996, Texas Tech University has sponsored fifteen varsity teams that compete in nine sports: American football, baseball, basketball, cross country running, golf, soccer, softball, tennis, track and field, and volleyball. When the university opened for 1925–26 academic year, three varsity teams, baseball, men's basketball, and football, were fielded during that season. Gene Alford, who began playing for the Portsmouth Spartans in 1931, was the first Texas Tech alumni to play in a professional league. Many more Texas Tech alumni have become professional athletes and coaches in sports leagues including Major League Baseball (MLB), the National Basketball Association (NBA), National Football League (NFL), and the Women's National Basketball Association (WNBA).

Several Texas Tech Red Raiders have been honored for both their collegiate, and professional achievements. Collegiality, six position awards have been awarded to seven Red Raiders. The Doak Walker Award, honoring the top college football running back, was presented to Bam Morris in 1993 and Byron Hanspard in 1996. The Sammy Baugh Trophy, honoring the top college football passer, was presented to Kliff Kingsbury in 2002, B. J. Symons in 2003, and Graham Harrell in 2007. Harrell also received the Johnny Unitas Golden Arm Award, honoring the most outstanding senior quarterback in college football, in 2008. Wes Welker received the Mosi Tatupu Award, presented to the special teams player of the year from 1997 to 2006, in 2003. In 2007, Michael Crabtree received the Fred Biletnikoff Award and Paul Warfield Award, honoring the top college football receiver. The following season, Crabtree received both awards again, becoming the only player to win either award more than once. Four Red Raiders, Donny Anderson, Hub Bechtol, E. J. Holub, and Dave Parks, have been named to the College Football Hall of Fame.  Three-time Olympic Gold Medalist and three-time WNBA Most Valuable Player Sheryl Swoopes, was the first player signed by the WNBA. Professionally, football coaches Carl Madison and John Parchman were named High School Football Coach of the Year by USA Today in 1988 and 1999 respectively.

Alumni

 "—" indicates that class year is unknown.
To sort these tables by alumni or class year, click on the  icon next to the column title.

Athletics

Baseball

Basketball

 Keenan Evans (born 1996), basketball player in the Israel Basketball Premier League
 Terran Petteway (born 1992), basketball player in the Israeli Basketball Premier League

Football

Golf

Volleyball

Notes

References

External links

Sportspeople
Texas Tech
Sportspeople
Texas Tech University sportspeople
Texas Tech University